Skorupa is a Polish surname. Notable people with the surname include:

 Katarzyna Skorupa (born 1984), Polish volleyball player
 Leszek Skorupa (1951–2018), Polish weightlifter

See also
 

Polish-language surnames